ARRS may refer to:

 American Roentgen Ray Society
 Association of Road Racing Statisticians